The CSR EMU is a series of electric multiple unit cars manufactured by CSR Corporation Limited for use on Buenos Aires' commuter rail network. As of 2015, the trains operated on three of the city's lines and 705 cars were manufactured, with each line using a different number of cars per train. They were created for use on lines electrified using both third rail and overhead lines.

Background

By 2013, the rolling stock of Buenos Aires' commuter rail network was ageing and deteriorating rapidly. At the same time, high-profile accidents in Flores and Once in previous years had led the national government to revise the concession-based railway privatisation, which was largely blamed for the deterioration of the network. The government thus decided to intervene, revoking concessions to companies such as Trenes de Buenos Aires and setting up Trenes Argentinos to manage the lines.

This was followed by a series of rolling stock purchases from China CNR Corporation and CSR Corporation Limited (and later some Argentine companies) to replace trains on both the diesel and rail segments. For the electrified lines, CSR won the contract to provide the electric multiple units, and an order was placed in January 2013 for 405 cars for the Mitre and Sarmiento lines, with another order for 300 cars for the Roca Line signed in August 2013.

The acquisition of the CSR rolling stock was also accompanied by a series of works on all three lines, to accommodate the new trains (e.g. the electrification of the Buenos Aires - La Plata segment on the Roca Line), and to generally improve rail services. On top of the emergency improvements undertaken following the Once Tragedy, some of these improvements included the modernisation of stations, raising the height of platforms to match the new trains, incorporating train protection systems, creating new underpasses and rail infrastructure improvements, some of which were also undertaken by the City of Buenos Aires. However, not all works were finished by the time the CSR EMUs arrived on their respective lines, and some works continued on while they were already running services.

A further 200 cars were purchased for the Roca Line in 2017 to replace the aging Toshiba EMUs which had exceeded their 30-year lifespan.

Overview

The units were built at CSR's Qingdao factory, a large complex with 1,640,000 m2 of covered space. The total cost for the 709 cars was $841 million, which also included R&D as well as shipping, or $1.09 million to $1.27 million per car depending on the line, which was noted as being significantly below market prices. In 2014, CSR then purchased the Argentine rolling stock manufacturer Emprendimientos Ferroviarios, in part to establish a place in Argentina to maintain the trains once they were in operation.

The trains have a series of features in line with modern rolling stock, such as ABS, air conditioning, CCTV, a train protection system and intelligent doors, while numerous components such as the brakes and traction system were sourced from countries such as Germany, Sweden and Japan. The Roca Line trains have some differences: overhead collection at 25 000 V (instead of 800 V third rail), more (but smaller) windows per car, and no CCTV cameras. The trains began to arrive in February 2014, just 13 months after the order was signed.

Usage

The electric multiple units are used on all of Buenos Aires' electrified commuter rail lines, with the exception of the Urquiza Line which uses Japanese Toshiba EMUs. The Belgrano Sur line had diesel multiple units with a similar appearance to the CSR electric multiple units, which arrived in the country from 2015. The San Martín Line also saw new rolling stock from CSR, but in the form of CSR SDD7 diesel-electric locomotives, while the Belgrano Norte line has seen the incorporation of Argentine-built EMEPA DMUs.

The Sarmiento Line was the first to begin operating the CSR trains in July 2014, followed by the Mitre Line and then the Roca Line. In the case of the Mitre and Sarmiento lines, the CSR EMUs make up the entirety of the electric rolling stock, while diesel segments such as the Victoria - Capilla del Señor route on the Mitre Line use Argentine-built Materfer CMM 400-2 DMUs. The first Roca Line trains began arriving in 2015, continuing to arrive throughout the year, and began to be integrated in June 2015. These are running alongside the existing Toshiba rolling stock purchased in 1985.

All the trains are operated by the state-owned Trenes Argentinos, which is now a part of the larger Ferrocarriles Argentinos umbrella company.

Gallery

See also

CSR SDD7 - Locomotive manufactured by the same company for the San Martin Line
CNR CKD8 - Other Chinese rolling stock in Argentina
CITIC-CNR - Chinese underground cars for the Buenos Aires Underground
Rail transport in Argentina

References

CRRC Group
CRRC multiple units
Rolling stock of Argentina
Train-related introductions in 2014
Articles containing video clips
25 kV AC multiple units